Podalia marmorata is a moth of the family Megalopygidae. It is found in South America, including Peru.

References

Moths described in 1910
Megalopygidae